Belphegor, Phantom of the Louvre is a 2001 French fantasy film directed by Jean-Paul Salomé. It stars Sophie Marceau, Michel Serrault, Frédéric Diefenthal, and Julie Christie. It was written by Salomé, Danièle Thompson, and Jérôme Tonnerre. The 2001 film is about a mummy's spirit that possesses a woman (Marceau) in the Louvre. Belphegor, Phantom of the Louvre was filmed on location at the Musée du Louvre, the first feature film to be shot in part inside the world-famous museum.

Source material
This adaptation was loosely based upon the 1927 Arthur Bernède horror novel Belphégor, which had appeared in concert with a film serial version of the story. A television miniseries had appeared in 1965.

Plot
A rare collection of artifacts from an archeological dig in Egypt are brought to the famous Musée du Louvre in Paris. While experts are using a laser scanning device to determine the age of a sarcophagus, a spirit escapes and makes its way into the museum's electrical system. Museum curator Faussier (Jean-Francois Balmer) brings in noted Egyptologist, Glenda Spencer (Julie Christie), to examine the findings, and she announces that the mummy inside the coffin was actually the evil spirit Belphegor.

Meanwhile, Lisa (Sophie Marceau), a young woman who lives across the street from the museum, follows her runaway cat into the Louvre after closing time. She accidentally receives an electrical shock that transfers the stray spirit into her body. Soon Lisa is disguising herself as Belphegor and making off with the rare Egyptian treasures on display at the museum, convinced that they are rightfully hers. When Belphegor proves more than a match for the Louvre's security forces, renowned detective Verlac (Michel Serrault) is brought out of retirement to find out why the museum's Egyptian collection has been shrinking.

Cast
 Sophie Marceau as Lisa / Belphegor
 Michel Serrault as Verlac
 Frédéric Diefenthal as Martin
 Julie Christie as Glenda Spender
 Jean-François Balmer as Bertrand Faussier
 Patachou as Geneviève 
 Lionel Abelanski as Simonnet 
 Françoise Lépine as Suzanne Dupré 
 François Levantal as Mangin 
 Jacques Martial as Félix 
 Philippe Maymat as Bob 
 Pierre Aussedat as Pierre Desfontaines 
 Matteo Vallon as Cemetery employee 
 Jean-Claude Bolle-Reddat as Cemetery warden 
 Juliette Gréco as Woman in the cemetery

Reception

Critical response
Critical reception for Belphegor, Phantom of the Louvre has been mostly negative. Justin Felix from DVD Talk gave the film a mixed two and a half out of five stars, writing, "Belphegor: Phantom of the Louvre is modestly entertaining, despite some very familiar plot elements and so-so CGI work." Chris Parry from eFilmCritic awarded the film two out of five stars, panning the film's acting, special effects, screenplay, and familiar premise. Steve Barton from Dread Central rated the film two and a half out of five stars, writing, "For all that it has going for it in the acting department, Belphégor Phantom of the Louvre comes up on the short side of the fence nearly everywhere else. It's a decent little time killer, but you'll ultimately start forgetting about it even before the end credits run."

References

External links
 
 
 

2000s French-language films
2001 horror films
2001 fantasy films
French dark fantasy films
Films set in Paris
French ghost films
Films based on horror novels
Films about spirit possession
Films based on French novels
Films based on television series
2001 films
Films directed by Jean-Paul Salomé
Films set in museums
Films produced by Alain Sarde
Films scored by Bruno Coulais
2000s French films